Steve Davis (November 19, 1952 – March 17, 2013) was a quarterback for the Oklahoma Sooners from 1973 to 1975. He was named the Most Valuable Player of the 1976 Orange Bowl, when the Sooners won their fifth national championship.

Davis led the Sooners to a  record as their starting quarterback, and holds the NCAA record for winning percentage in that position. With Davis at the helm of the wishbone offense, the Sooners won consecutive national titles in 1974 and 1975.
Davis was later a commentator for ABC and CBS college football telecasts in the 1970s and 1980s.

Born at Barksdale Air Force Base in Bossier City, Louisiana, Davis was raised in Sallisaw, Oklahoma.  Later in life a born again Christian, he featured as a speaker giving his Christian testimony.

Death
Davis died at age 60 when the small jet in which he was a passenger crashed on approach in South Bend, Indiana, on March 17, 2013. The NTSB report later found that Davis, an experienced pilot but not in the Beechcraft Premier I being used that day, was allowed to fly the plane by the pilot; as the plane neared its destination, Davis inadvertently cut power to the engines, and the pilot was unable to complete an emergency landing successfully.

References

External links
Sports-Reference – Steve Davis

1952 births
2013 deaths
Accidental deaths in Indiana
American football quarterbacks
Aviators from Louisiana
Aviators killed in aviation accidents or incidents in the United States
Christians from Louisiana
Oklahoma Sooners football players
People from Sallisaw, Oklahoma
Players of American football from Oklahoma
Sports commentators
Sportspeople from Bossier City, Louisiana
Victims of aviation accidents or incidents in 2013